The Shot is a 1969 Swedish thriller film directed by Claes Fellbom.

Cast
 Peter Schildt as Ronny
 Cia Löwgren as Len
 Kent-Arne Dahlgren as Bertil 'Kompis' Johansson
 Solveig Ternström as Len's Mother
 Halvar Björk as Len's Father
 Tord Peterson as Driver (as Tord Pettersson)
 Leif Ahrle as Fixaren
 Harry Ahlin as Old Man
 Hans Strååt as Ronny's Father

References

External links
 

1969 films
1969 thriller films
Swedish thriller films
1960s Swedish-language films
1960s Swedish films